Arrhyton taeniatum, the broad-striped racerlet or Günther's Island racer, is a species of snake in the family Colubridae. It is found in Cuba.

References 

Arrhyton
Reptiles described in 1858
Reptiles of Cuba
Taxa named by Albert Günther